The Three Wise Kings vs Santa is a 2022 Spanish Christmas comedy film directed by Paco Caballero. It stars Karra Elejalde, David Verdaguer, and Matías Janick as the Three Wise Men alongside Adal Ramones, Andrés Almeida and Eva Ugarte, Isa Montalbán, Cosette Silguero, and Laura Quirós, among others.

Plot 
The Three Wise Men and Santa vie for the children's attention, unbeknownst that their struggle will wake the Krampus from its slumber.

Cast

Production 

The Three Wise Kings vs Santa is a Morena Films and Melchor, Gaspar y Baltasar AIE production, and it had the participation of Prime Video and RTVE and support from the Government of Castilla–La Mancha. Shooting locations included Toledo, Segovia, Madrid and the Canary Islands. Shooting had already wrapped by May 2022. David Valldepérez worked as cinematographer, Nacho Ruiz Capillas as film editor whilst Pilar Onares was responsible for the music.

Release 
The film had its world premiere at the 19th Seville European Film Festival in November 2022. Distributed by Tripictures, it is set to open in Spanish theatres on 18 November 2022. Following the theatrical window, it will be released on Amazon Prime Video.

See also 
 List of Spanish films of 2022
 List of Christmas films
 Santa Claus in film

References 

Morena Films films
Films shot in the province of Toledo
Films shot in the Canary Islands
2022 comedy films
Spanish Christmas comedy films
Santa Claus in film
2020s Spanish-language films
2020s Spanish films
2020s Christmas comedy films